A list of films produced in Italy in 1920 (see 1920 in film):

External links
 Italian films of 1920 at the Internet Movie Database

Italian
1920
Films